Georg Gross (born 22 January 1983) is an Estonian rally driver. He won the Estonian Rally Championship three times, in 2013, 2017 and 2019.

Rally results

WRC results
 
* Season still in progress.

Personal life
Georg Gross is the son of the Estonian entrepreneur Oleg Gross. He and his wife Katrin Gross have a daughter together.

References

External links

Georg Gross's e-wrc profile

1983 births
Living people
Estonian rally drivers
World Rally Championship drivers